Lu Xiyun (born April 1963) is a Chinese physicist currently serving as director of the School of Engineering Science, University of Science and Technology of China.

Biography
Lu was born in Taizhou, Jiangsu in April 1963. He completed his doctor's degree from the University of Science and Technology of China in 1992.

He was a visiting scholar at Pennsylvania State University, University of Houston, University of Tennessee, University of Tokyo, Northeastern University, Hong Kong University of Science and Technology and National University of Singapore since 1992.

He is now the director of the School of Engineering Science, University of Science and Technology of China.

Honours and awards
 "Chang Jiang Scholar" (or "Yangtze River Scholar") 
 November 22, 2019 Academician of the Chinese Academy of Sciences (CAS)

References

External links
 

1963 births
Living people
People from Taizhou, Jiangsu
Physicists from Jiangsu
University of Science and Technology of China alumni
Academic staff of the University of Science and Technology of China
Members of the Chinese Academy of Sciences